The 2022 Santa Cruz Challenger II, also known as Dove MEN + CARE Bolivia Open to differentiate it from the previous edition played the same year, was a professional tennis tournament played on clay courts. It was the second edition of the tournament which was part of the 2022 ATP Challenger Tour. It took place in Santa Cruz de la Sierra, Bolivia between 21 and 27 March 2022.

Singles main-draw entrants

Seeds

 1 Rankings are as of 14 March 2022.

Other entrants
The following players received wildcards into the singles main draw:
  Pablo Cuevas
  Murkel Dellien
  Juan Carlos Prado Angelo

The following players received entry into the singles main draw as alternates:
  Nick Hardt
  Johan Nikles

The following players received entry from the qualifying draw:
  Nicolás Barrientos
  Corentin Denolly
  Gilbert Klier Júnior
  Naoki Nakagawa
  Yshai Oliel
  Juan Bautista Torres

The following players received entry as lucky losers:
  Daniel Dutra da Silva
  Facundo Juárez
  Gonzalo Villanueva

Champions

Singles

  Paul Jubb def.  Juan Pablo Varillas 6–3, 7–6(7–5).

Doubles

  Jesper de Jong /  Bart Stevens def.  Nicolás Barrientos /  Miguel Ángel Reyes-Varela 6–4, 3–6, [10–6].

References

2022 ATP Challenger Tour
2022 in Bolivian sport
March 2022 sports events in South America